Pico 31 de Março, or Pico Trinta e Um de Março in full, also known as Pico Phelps, is a mountain on the Brazil–Venezuela border. Pico 31 de Março can be considered a secondary summit of Pico da Neblina. Therefore, it is usually climbed by expeditions primarily aiming to reach the other peak. The two are linked by a col that can be easily traversed in a short trek of about an hour.

Discovery and naming
The peak was first discovered in 1954 by the Basset Maguire's expedition to the north side of the mountain massif. It was later climbed during the first attempt to climb Pico da Neblina, by a Brazilian army expedition. It received its name (meaning "March 31 Peak" in Portuguese) as a self-homage by the military regime instated in Brazil a few months earlier on that date, in a coup d'état which was then officially called the "March 31 Revolution." The peak was finally reached in the following year by another army expedition to Pico da Neblina. The name was not changed after Brazil returned to democratic rule in 1985. The peak is known as Pico Phelps in Venezuela, and it is that country's highest point outside of the Andes.

Location
Pico da Neblina, in whose massif Pico 31 de Março is located, is the highest point on the Guiana Shield. Neblina means "fog" in both Portuguese and Spanish. The mountains are contained in the Brazilian Pico da Neblina National Park; their northern slopes are also protected in Venezuela's Serranía de la Neblina National Park. The twin parks, together with the neighbouring Parima Tapirapecó National Park (Venezuela), form a protected area complex of about 80,000 km2, possibly the largest national park system on tropical rainforests in the world.

Elevation measurements

This was then officially recognised by the Brazilian Institute of Geography and Statistics (IBGE), the federal government's official geographic survey and census agency, which jointly organised the expedition.

There was no new expedition or field measurement at the time; the new value is simply a mathematical recalculation of the altitude, based on the previously obtained GPS field data, taking into account a newly available, more precise mapping of the Brazilian territory regarding the geoid (the imaginary surface based on the Earth's gravitational field that is the reference for altitudes). This explains why Pico da Neblina and Pico 31 de Março, which are next to each other, had both exactly the same altitude correction.

Geology and topography
The Neblina massif is a glaciated tor composed of a tilted block of sandstone overlying Precambrian metamorphic rocks. In contrast to the sharp tooth shape of its higher neighbour, Pico 31 de Março has a smoother shape and is sometimes difficult to be clearly distinguished from Pico da Neblina on photographs, depending on the angle and distance from which the photograph was taken. Due to its equatorial latitude, while it can be cold on top, sub-freezing temperatures and frost appear to be rare (no permanent measurements are undertaken), and there is no snow.

Access
Due to its location in a national park in a border area that is also part of Yanomami territory, access to the area is restricted and depends on a special permit by the Chico Mendes Institute for Biodiversity Conservation (ICMBio). The permit can be obtained at ICMBio's office in São Gabriel da Cachoeira, but all climbers must take an accredited local guide. A four-day trek each way should be expected, three of which consisting of a jungle trek in the rainforest that can be as hard and challenging as the climb itself. Rescue is close to impossible in the area.

Onchocerciasis or "river blindness," a parasitic disease that can cause permanent blindness and is transmitted by a black fly, is endemic in the area, albeit with a low incidence; malaria and yellow fever transmission are also possible. Therefore, climbers are advised not only to take the utmost precaution in avoiding insect bites, but also to discuss preventive and/or therapeutic strategies with their physicians.

See also
 Pico da Neblina National Park
 Guiana Shield

References

 Maguire, Bassett and Reynolds, Charles D. (1955) "Cerro de la Neblina, Amazonas, Venezuela: A Newly discovered Sandstone Mountain" Geographical Review 45(1): pp. 27–51
 Instituto Brasileiro de Desenvolvimento Florestal (1979) Plano do Sistema de Unidades de Conservação do Brasil. Ministério da Agricultura (MA), Instituto Brasileiro de Desenvolvimento Florestal (IBDF) and Fundação Brasileira para a Conservação da Natureza (FBCN), Brasília, D.F., OCLC 6944034. In Portuguese, covers the geology, geomorphology, climate, soils, vegetation and fauna of Pico da Neblina National Park.
 Gentry, A.H. (1986) "Exploring the Mountain of the Mists" Science Year: The World Book Science Annual pp. 124–139

External links
 Best article of the  31 de March Peak, with the full article detailing the expedition, maps, tracklogs, camps, logistics and many photos (clubedosaventureiros.com)
 Picasa gallery of photographs from two Brazilian private expeditions to Pico da Neblina, maintained by Orlei S. Jr. of the Brazilian Mundo Vertical mountaineering site, where some pictures also show Pico 31 de Março as a rounded secondary peak. There is also a picture of Pico da Neblina taken from the top of 31 de Março, showing how close the two peaks are.
 "Pico 31 de Março" Peakbagger

31 de Marco
31 de Marco
Brazil–Venezuela border
International mountains of South America
Landforms of Amazonas (Brazilian state)